Simple Soap Binding Profile (official abbreviation is SSBP) is a specification from the Web Services Interoperability industry consortium. It is intended as a support profile for the WS-I Basic Profile.

This profile defines the way WSDL (Web Services Description Language) documents are to bind operations to a specific transport protocol SOAP.

The Basic Profile 1.0 included the content and function of the Simple Soap Binding Profile. In other words, the Basic Profile 1.0 is roughly equivalent to the Basic Profile 1.1 plus the Simple Soap Binding Profile 1.0. 
Now that the Simple Soap Binding Profile is a separate profile, other WS-I documents can re-use (reference) it.

External links 
 WS-I SSBP 1.0 Official specifications

Web service specifications
Interoperability